Nora Abu Shanab (or Noura Abo Shanab, ; born 9 December 1987) is an Israeli footballer who plays as a defender and has appeared for the Israel women's national team.

International career
Shanab has been capped for the Israel national team, appearing for the team during the 2019 FIFA Women's World Cup qualifying cycle.

Personal life
Shanab is ethnically Arab.

References

External links
 
 
 

1987 births
Living people
People from Jadeidi-Makr
Israeli women's footballers
Women's association football defenders
Ligat Nashim players
Israel women's international footballers
Arab-Israeli footballers